The 2023 Liga 1 de Fútbol Profesional (known as the Liga 1 Betsson 2023 for sponsorship reasons) is the 107th season of the Peruvian Primera División, the highest division of Peruvian football. A total of 19 teams compete in the season, which began on 3 February and is scheduled to end in November 2023. The season was originally scheduled to begin on 21 January, but the first two matchdays were postponed due to the 2022–2023 Peruvian protests. The fixtures for the season were announced on 30 December 2022.

Alianza Lima are the defending champions, having won back-to-back titles in 2021 and 2022.

Teams
19 teams take part in the league in this season: the top 16 teams from the 2022 tournament, plus the 2022 Copa Perú champions Deportivo Garcilaso, the Liga 2 champions Cusco and Unión Comercio, the winners of the promotion/relegation play-off. The promoted teams replaced Ayacucho, Universidad San Martín and Carlos Stein, who were relegated at the end of the previous season.

Stadia and locations

Personnel and kits

Managerial changes

Notes

Torneo Apertura

Standings

Results

Torneo Clausura

Standings

Results

Aggregate table

Top scorers

{| class="wikitable" border="1"
|-
! Rank
! Player
! Club
! Goals
|-
| rowspan=2 align=center | 1
| Yorleys Mena
|Universidad César Vallejo
| rowspan=2 align=center | 5
|-
| Santiago Giordana
|Deportivo Garcilaso
|-
| rowspan=4 align=center | 3
| Carlos Garcés
|Cienciano
| rowspan=4 align=center | 4
|-
| Luis Urruti
|Universitario
|-
| Brayan Fernández
|Binacional
|-
| Ronal Huaccha
|Sport Huancayo
|-
| rowspan=7 align=center | 7
| Janio Posito
|ADT
| rowspan=7 align=center | 3
|-
| Alejandro Hohberg
|Sporting Cristal
|-
| Miguel Cornejo
|Alianza Atlético
|-
| Gabriel Leyes
|Cantolao
|-
| Pablo Sabbag
|Alianza Lima
|-
| Neri Bandiera
|Atlético Grau
|-
| Abdiel Ayarza
|Cusco
|}

Source: Futbolperuano.com

See also
 2023 Liga 2
 2023 Copa Perú
 2023 Ligas Departamentales del Perú
 2023 Torneo de Promoción y Reserva
 2023 Liga Femenina

References

External links
Official website 
Liga 1 news at Peru.com 
Liga 1 statistics and news at Dechalaca.com 

2023
Peru
Peru
Peru